Selangor Football Club U-23  (Malay: Kelab Bola Sepak Selangor B-23), commonly referred to as Selangor U-23 (who formely known as Selangor II), is a professional Malaysian football reserve team club of Selangor, based in Shah Alam, Selangor. The club are nicknamed the Young Giants. Founded in 1967 as part of the sports and recreation club for the Selangor State Development Corporation (KSR PKNS). The club were formerly known as PKNS FC when the club was merged with the Football Association of Selangor, then converted into a reserve team (as part of the Malaysian Football League's feeder club regulations) under Selangor first team and were rebranded as Selangor II before later than known as a Selangor U-23. The club are currently playing in the Malaysia Premier League and play their home games at UiTM Stadium with a 10,000-seater capacity.

Unlike in England, reserve teams in Malaysia play in the same football pyramid as their first team rather than a separate system. However, reserve teams cannot play in the same division as their first team. Therefore, the team is ineligible for promotion to the Malaysia Super League, the division in which their parent side competes in. Reserve teams are also no longer permitted to enter cup competitions other than the Malaysia Challenge Cup.

The team is officially known as Selangor U-23 on the club's official promotion and website, as the Malaysian Football League, the governing body of the top two divisions in the Malaysian football league system has rules that prohibits reserve teams from having different names than their parent team.

History

1967–2003: Beginnings 

The Selangor State Development Corporation (PKNS) have been involved in the sporting arena since 1967 through the establishment of its Sports and Recreation Club within the organization for their staff to be involved in sports and recreational activities. The PKNS Sports and Recreation Club football team had its own staff as footballers in the early stages. The football team made its name between the 1970s to 1980s as one of the forces in the state of Selangor that competed in the Selangor League at state-level and the Malaysia FAM Cup at the national level with famous players like Mokhtar Dahari, R. Arumugam, K. Rajagopal, Reduan Abdullah and Santokh Singh, who also served as PKNS' staff. The Malaysia FAM Cup was opened to club teams from 1974 onwards while the Malaysia Cup was restricted to state teams, but some PKNS players appeared in both competitions.

The club's involvement in football has seen many achievements. The club has produced a number of football players that not only succeeded at club level but also at state, national and international levels. Their routine was to work in the day and in the evening to practice for the company football club to play in state league and Malaysia FAM Cup games, with the possibility of also playing for the state of Selangor in the Malaysia Cup. PKNS' Sport and Recreational Club first won the Malaysia FAM Cup together with Negeri Sembilan Indians in 1978 after both teams were tied 0-0. The following year, the club beat Hong Chin 2–1 to win the Malaysia FAM Cup. Among the players that made up this squad were K. Rajagobal, Mokhtar Dahari, Santokh Singh and R. Arumugam who were also regular fixtures of the Selangor state team.

2004–2015: As PKNS Football Club 
After winning the Malaysia FAM Cup in 2003, the club was formed as a professional football team known as PKNS Football Club (PKNS FC) in 2004 to compete in the newly formed Malaysia Premier League which was organized by the Football Association of Malaysia (FAM). The club became a regular in the league after they achieved promotion to the league in 2004 as champions of the Malaysia FAM Cup the previous year, staying in the division for the rest of the 2000s.

In 2012, PKNS extended its wings to the Malaysia Super League after winning the Malaysia Premier League in the 2011 season. The organization had allocated a sum of money to PKNS in order to support all age level teams that are under the PKNS banner. These included the first team in the Malaysia Super League, the Under-21 team in the President Cup, an amateur team in the Selangor League, as well as the Under-17 team in the KPM-FAM Youth Cup. The club played in the country's top division league, the Malaysia Super League for several seasons before being relegated to the Malaysia Premier League in the 2014 season. But after spending two years in the Malaysia Premier League, the club achieved promotion back to the Malaysia Super League after finishing second in 2016.

2016–2019: Privatization of PKNS Football Club 
As part of the privatization effort by the Malaysian Football League (MFL), the organization body and company that operates and runs the Malaysian League, to transform and move Malaysian football forward. Every club in the Malaysia Super League and the Malaysia Premier League were required to obtain a Football Association of Malaysia Club Licensing Regulations (FAM CLR) license in order to compete in the Malaysian League. The team was incorporated as a private company under the name of PKNS Sports Sdn Bhd.

In 2016, PKNS left its affiliation with the Football Association of Selangor (FAS) in order to comply with the licensing requirement. The club however chose to affiliate itself with the Selangor Malays Football Association in order to secure its future and along with its nine other youth teams during the conflict between itself and the FAS when the FAS decided to halt PKNS's participation in the 2017 Malaysia Super League. It was clarified by the FAM that PKNS did not need to affiliate itself with any other FAM affiliates to compete in any competition managed by the MFL.

The club obtained the FAM CLR License to play in the 2018 Malaysia Super League and also obtained the AFC Club License and was eligible to play in either the 2018 AFC Champions League or the 2018 AFC Cup if the club qualified on merit. In 2019, the club were also able to obtain all club licenses as the previous season. At the end of the 2019 season, PKNS FC were then converted as a reserve team (as part of the feeder club regulations in the Malaysian Football League) under Selangor first team and were rebranded as Selangor II.

2020: Merging with Selangor Football Club 
 
The team is now officially known as Selangor II (before later than known as a Selangor U-23) as part of the first team's project to create a new DNA for football in Selangor as well as a developmental path for the other reserve sides under the Selangor first team banner, with the guidance of Michael Feichtenbeiner who also acts as the parent club's technical director. Starting from the 2020 season, as part of the restructuring and rebranding as Selangor II, the team kits will be the same as first team. The kits are produced by the Spanish sportswear company, Joma and are officially sponsored by Joma Malaysia.

Brand and identity

Crest and colours 

The original emblem that was first created in 1936 was a result of the merger between the Selangor Football Association (SFA) and Selangor Association Football League (SAFL) that contained the symbol of the wildebeest (gaurus). In the early-1970s, the FA of Selangor's symbol, the head of the wildebeest, was replaced with the Flag and coat of arms of Selangor and the English lettering in the FA of Selangor emblem was written in Malay.

The crest is shaped like a shield, while the emblem on the upper part of the crest is derived from the Selangor State Council coat of arms. The colour characteristics on the crest is the main colour of the state of Selangor which symbolizes Bravery for red and Royalty for yellow. Both of these colors are linked to the state flag which follows the identity of Selangor. The crest is then completed by featuring the state's blazon on the top of it.

Main team 

• Selangor

Reserve Teams

Kits 
From the 2000s, the team kit was manufactured by various companies including Nike, Adidas, Lotto and Kappa.

Grounds

Stadium

Training Centre

Players

Current squad

Management team

Managerial history

Manager

Head coach

Season by season record

Honours

Domestic

League
Malaysia Premier League
 Winners (1): 2011
 Runners-up (1): 2016
 Malaysia FAM League
 Winners (3): 1978, 1979, 2003

Cups
Malaysia FA Cup
Runners-up (1): 2016

References

External links
 FA Selangor (official website)

Malaysia Premier League clubs
Football clubs in Malaysia
1967 establishments in Malaysia
Association football clubs established in 1967
Selangor II
Selangor FA
Malaysian reserve football teams